GGG or Triple G may refer to:

Media
 GGG, the production code for the 1971 Doctor Who serial The Claws of Axos
 German Goo Girls, a series of pornographic films by John Thompson Productions
 Grinding Gear Games, a New Zealand video game developer company
 Gunnar Graps Group, an Estonian rock group 
 Guns, God and Government, the third live video album by American rock band Marilyn Manson
 Gutsy Geoid Guard, antagonists from the Japanese anime television series The King of Braves GaoGaiGar
 Guy's Grocery Games, an American reality-based cooking television game show
 Ward Hayden and The Outliers (previously Girls, Guns and Glory), a band from Boston, Massachusetts

Organisations
 Germanische Glaubens-Gemeinschaft, a group involved in Germanic neopaganism in Germany
 Gesellschaft für das Gute und Gemeinnützige, a private, non-profit organization founded in 1777
 Good and Green Guyana, a political party in Guyana
 Graco (fluid handling) (NYSE: GGG), an American fluid handling company
 Greenland Minerals (ASX ticker symbol: GGG), an Australian exploration company

People
 Gentaro (wrestler) (born 1974), Japanese professional wrestler
 Gennady Golovkin (born 1982), Kazakhstani professional boxer

Other
 East Texas Regional Airport (IATA code & FAA LID: GGG), an airport located in Gregg County, Texas
 Gadolinium gallium garnet, a synthetic crystalline material of the garnet group
 GGG ("good, giving, and game"), a sex-positive ideal coined by sex-advice columnist Dan Savage
 Giant Global Graph, a neologism to differentiate between the existing World Wide Web and that of Web 3.0
 Gurgula language (ISO 639-3 code: ggg), a Rajasthani language of Pakistan
 GGG, a codon for the amino acid glycine

See also
 3G (disambiguation)
 G3 (disambiguation)